Thomas Eddy (1758–1827) was a New York merchant, philanthropist and politician. Thomas Eddy may also refer to:

 T. V. Eddy (Thomas Valentine Eddy, 1853–1918), American politician in the state of Washington
 Thomas Mears Eddy (1823–1874), American clergyman and author

See also
Eddy Thomas (c. 1932–2014), Jamaican dancer, choreographer and dance instructor
Thomas Eddy Tallmadge (1876–1940), American architect
Thomas Eadie (1887–1974), U.S. Navy diver and a recipient of the Medal of Honor
Thomas Wardrope Eadie (1898–1986), president of Bell Telephone of Canada